Gabriel Paul Katz is an American bassist and founding member of the noise rock band Blind Idiot God. He performed with the band since its formation, recording three studio albums with them between 1987 and 1992. He also assisted bandmate Andy Hawkins in the recording of his Drone music project Halo, released as Azonic in 1994.

Biography 
Gabriel Katz founded Blind Idiot God with drummer Ted Epstein and guitarist Andy Hawkins in 1982. After three albums, Blind Idiot God went on hiatus in 1996 when Epstein left the group. Katz reunited with Hawkins after Tim Wyskida joined the band as a full-time member. However, he developed tendinitis and hearing problems which further delayed band activities. He joined them on stage for their 2006 tour and performed with them until his departure in 2012. He has named John Coltrane as being the greatest influence to him as a musician, saying "He made me realize that music could be a really powerful tool."

Discography 
Blind Idiot God
Blind Idiot God (SST, 1987)
Undertow (Enemy, 1988)
Cyclotron (Avant, 1992)

Other appearances
Praxis: Sacrifist (Subharmonic, 1993)
Azonic:  Halo (Strata, 1994)
Automaton:  Dub Terror Exhaust (Strata, 1994)

References 

Year of birth missing (living people)
Living people
American bass guitarists
American punk rock bass guitarists
Math rock musicians
Post-hardcore musicians
Noise rock musicians
Blind Idiot God members
Musicians from St. Louis
Guitarists from Missouri
American male bass guitarists